Holyhead Town Football Club is a Welsh football team based in Holyhead, Anglesey, Wales.  The team currently play in the North Wales Coast West Football League Division One, which is at the fifth tier of the Welsh football league system.

History
The team was formed in 1925 and competed in the Welsh National League, North Wales Football Combination and North Wales Coast League before beginning a long stay in the Welsh League North in 1935–36.  They were four times league champions in 1949–50, 1957–58, 1963–64 and 1969–70. They dropped into the Anglesey League from the 1975–76 season.

The club went out of existence between 1998 and 2009, and again from 2012–13 to 2015–16. They reformed in 2016, winning the Anglesey League in their first season back, the Gwynedd League title the following season and promotion to the Welsh Alliance League. For the 2018–19 season re-introduced a reserve side in the Anglesey League.

The club resigned from the Welsh Alliance League in December 2019 but did not fold with its reserve side, in the Anglesey League becoming its first team.

They then joined the newly formed North Wales Coast West Football League Division One for the 2020–21 season, a season which was cancelled due to the COVID-19 pandemic, with the club starting the 2021–22 season when amateur football returned to Wales in the summer of 2021.

In the Welsh Cup the club has twice reached the quarter-final stages in 1960–61 and 1961–62.

Honours

League
Welsh League North 
Champions (4): 1949–50, 1957–58, 1963–64, 1969–70 
Gwynedd League
Champions (2): 1992–93, 2017–18
Anglesey League
Champions (6):  1967–68 (reserves), 1969–70 (reserves), 1979–80, 1985–86, 1987–88, 2016–17
Runners-up: 1988–89 (reserves)

Cups
NWCFA Challenge Cup – Winners (2): 1955–56; 1966–67
North Wales Coast FA Junior Challenge Cup – Winners (1): 1987-88
Cwpan Gwynedd – Winners: 2017–18
Lucas Oil Cup - Winners: 2016–17
Megan Cup – Winners: 2016–17

External links
Club official Facebook

References

Anglesey League clubs
Gwynedd League clubs
North Wales Coast Football League clubs
1925 establishments in Wales
Sport in Anglesey
Football clubs in Wales
Welsh Alliance League clubs
Holyhead
Association football clubs established in 1925
Welsh League North clubs
North Wales Coast League clubs